Empress Dowager Xiaoding (1545 – 18 March 1614), of the Li clan, was the mother of the Wanli Emperor. She was the nominal Regent of China during the minority of her son from 1572 to 1582. She became known in history under her posthumous name, Xiaoding.

Life
She was the daughter of the pauper Li Wei (d. 1584). She became a servant girl at the Imperial Palace of the Longqing Emperor, where she was eventually promoted to concubine. In 1563, she gave birth to a son, who was declared Hereditary Prince of Yu first, then Crown Prince after Longqing's succession to the throne. Because of her success, her father was ennobled. Her social career was not unusual during the Ming dynasty, were several empresses, consorts and concubines came from a poor background and made a similar career. She herself was described as humble and submissive, acting in accordance with the female ideal of her time.

In 1572, her son succeeded to the throne at the age of nine. She was given the title of empress dowager and, in accordance with tradition, named regent during the minority of her son. She did not play any part in state affairs, which was entirely in the hands of Zhang Juzheng. Her son's de facto rule did not begin until after the death of Zhang Juzheng in 1582. From 1572 until 1578, she lived, on the request of officials, in the palace of the emperor rather than the empress dowager palace, to supervise his life and daily habits. She was strict with him and punished him if he, for example, refused to study. 

When her son was deliberating whether to appoint his eldest son as heir apparent, because his mother, Consort Gong was originally a palace woman, she pointed out to him that he too was the son of a palace maid, and the appointment went through.

Titles 
During the reign of the Jiajing Emperor (r. 1521–1567):
Lady Li (李氏; from 1545)
Palace Lady (宮人; from 1550)
Concubine (from 1560)
During the reign of the Longqing Emperor (r. 1567–1572):
Imperial Noble Consort (皇貴妃; from March 1567)
During the reign of the Wanli Emperor (r. 1572–1620):
Empress Dowager Cisheng (慈聖皇太后;  from 19 July 1572)
Empress Dowager Cisheng Xuanwen Mingsu (慈聖宣文皇太后; from 1578)
Empress Dowager Cisheng Xuanwen Mingsu (慈聖宣文明肅皇太后; from 1582)
Empress Dowager Cisheng Xuanwen Mingsu Zhenshou Duanxian (慈聖宣文明肅貞壽端獻皇太后; from 1601)
Empress Dowager Cisheng Xuanwen Mingsu Zhenshou Duanxian Gongxi (慈聖宣文明肅貞壽端獻恭熹皇太后; from 1606)
Empress Dowager Xiaoding  Zhenchun Qinren Duansu Bitian Zuosheng (孝定貞純欽仁端肅弼天祚聖皇太后, from 1614)

Issue 
As Concubine Li:
Zhu Yijun, the Wanli Emperor (神宗 朱翊鈞; 4 September 1563 – 18 August 1620), the Longqing Emperor's third son
Princess Shouyang (壽陽公主; 1565–1590), personal name Yao'e (堯娥), the Longqing Emperor's third daughter
Married Hou Gongchen in 1581
As Imperial Noble Consort Li:
Princess Yongning (永寧公主; 11 March 1567 – 22 July 1594), personal name Yaoying (堯媖), the Longqing Emperor's fourth daughter
Married Liang Bangrui (d. 9 May 1582) in 1582
Zhu Yiliu, Prince Jian of Lu (潞簡王 朱翊鏐; 3 March 1568 – 4 July 1614), the Longqing Emperor's fourth son
Princess Rui'an (瑞安公主; 1569–1629), personal name Yaoyuan (堯媛), the Longqing Emperor's fifth daughter
Married Wan Wei (d. 1644) in 1585, and had issue (one son)

See also
 Empress Dowager Xiaozhuang

References

Books 
 Hsieh Bao Hua:  Concubinage and Servitude in Late Imperial China

1544 births
1614 deaths
Chinese empresses dowager
16th-century women rulers
16th-century Chinese people
16th-century Chinese women
People from Tongzhou